Chain O' Lakes is a census-designated place in the towns of Farmington and Dayton, Waupaca County, Wisconsin, United States. Its population was 981 as of the 2010 census. Before 2010, it was part of the Chain O' Lakes-King CDP.  It consists of twenty-two lakes connected by channels, natural openings, and creeks. In the Menominee language, the chain of lakes are called Sīsepikamiw. This name literally means "Sprawling water, like an animal basking in the sun".

References

Census-designated places in Waupaca County, Wisconsin
Census-designated places in Wisconsin